Zinar may refer to:
 Zenari, Iran
 The Hittite lyre